The Benjamin Cooper House is an 18th-century farmhouse and ferry house in Camden, New Jersey in the United States located at Erie Street in the Pyne Point neighborhood in North Camden. It was originally built in 1734 and served as ferry stop as well as residence. It later was a hotel and entertainment venue. The building suffered extensive damage in a fire on Thanksgiving Day 2012.

The Benjamin Cooper House built as a two-story Dutch colonial home with an addition made later in the late 18th century. The main part of the house is built from stone the subsequent addition of brick. During the occupation of Philadelphia by the British and Hessian's forces in the American Revolutionary War it served as a headquarters for British Lt. Colonel Abercromby. In the early 19th century it served as a pleasure garden and would be open in the springs and summers to the public. It served as the last ferry tavern in Camden and as a saloon in its later years known as the Old Stone Jug. Toward the end of the 19th century it would be purchased by the John H. Mathis company.

See also
Joseph Cooper House
Pomona Hall
National Register of Historic Places listings in Camden County, New Jersey
List of the oldest buildings in New Jersey

References 

Buildings and structures in Camden, New Jersey
Tourist attractions in Camden, New Jersey
National Register of Historic Places in Camden County, New Jersey
History of Camden, New Jersey
Hotels in New Jersey
Stone houses in New Jersey